Prazaroki is an agro-town in Vitebsk Region, Belarus.

History
In 1666, the village was bought by Justynian Szczytt, who became a founder of the Franciscan cloister at Prazaroki.
During World War II, Jews of the town were murdered in a mass execution perpetrated by an Einsatzgruppen.

Famous people 
 Ihnat Ciarenćjevič Bujnicki (1861—1917) - an actor and director
 Michal Piatroŭski - a Catholic priest

Footnotes 

Populated places in Vitebsk Region
Jewish Belarusian history
Holocaust locations in Belarus